North Falmouth station was a railroad station on the Old Colony Railroad on Depot Road in North Falmouth, Massachusetts. Service to the station began in 1872 and ended in 1964, and the station burned down in 1969.

History

The North Falmouth station was built in 1872 by the Old Colony Railroad as part of its Woods Hole Branch running from Buzzards Bay to Woods Hole, Massachusetts. In 1893, the New York, New Haven and Hartford Railroad (NH) leased the Old Colony Railroad and took over operations on its lines. In 1905, NH replaced the station with a larger building. When the nearby military training facility of Camp Edwards (now part of Joint Base Cape Cod) was built in 1940–1941, a spur line was built from North Falmouth station to Camp Edwards station on the base. 

Scheduled service to North Falmouth ended in 1964 when NH discontinued its passenger service to Cape Cod, and in 1969, the station building burned down.

In 2009, the Woods Hole Branch's right-of-way south of the former North Falmouth station was paved as part of the extension of the Shining Sea Bikeway. The former station site is used as the bike path's northern terminus and parking lot. As of 2017, the Woods Hole Branch north of the former station site and the spur to Joint Base Cape Cod are in active use. The tracks are used by the Massachusetts Coastal Railroad to haul trash from the Upper Cape Regional Transfer Station to the Southeastern Massachusetts Resource Recovery Facility (SEMASS) waste-to-energy and recycling facility.

References

External links

Falmouth, Massachusetts
Old Colony Railroad Stations on Cape Cod
Former railway stations in Massachusetts